The Fight of the Century usually refers to the 1971 Joe Frazier vs. Muhammad Ali boxing match .

Fight of the Century may also refer to:

 the 1910 boxing match between James Jeffries and Jack Johnson
 the 1921 boxing match between Georges Carpentier and Jack Dempsey
 the 1938 boxing match between Joe Louis and Max Schmeling
 the 2009 boxing match between David Tua vs Shane Cameron
 the 2015 boxing match between Floyd Mayweather Jr. and Manny Pacquiao